Kharlun (Kharlan) is a rural locality (a settlement) in Bichursky District, Republic of Buryatia, Russia. The population was 34 as of 2010. There are 3 streets.

Geography 
Kharlun is located 54 km west of Bichura (the district's administrative centre) by road. Sredny Kharlun is the nearest rural locality.

References 

Rural localities in Bichursky District